Underdogs is a 2013 football sports drama film directed by Doug Dearth. The film is loosely based on true events which occurred in and around Canton, Ohio.

Plot
Bobby Burkett (Logan Huffman) is a promising quarterback for a struggling high-school football team. Vince DeAntonio (D. B. Sweeney) is a former college football offensive coordinator, who abruptly resigned five years earlier, and has now become coach at the high school. The coach realizes the team needs more depth, and recruits several unlikely new players. Over the course of the season, Bobby falls for Renee (Maddie Hasson) a cheerleader at a rival high school, who also is the love interest of the rival school's quarterback (Charlie Carver). Bobby's father (William Mapother), is an inventor who works for the rival quarterback's father (Richard Portnow). The inventor gets sued by his employer over the intellectual property rights to a new space heater design, and must struggle to keep his invention. The employer's company is also planning to move manufacturing to Mexico, eliminating jobs in the community. The story climaxes in a charity football game between the rival teams, which serves as a rallying point for the inventor's family, the school, and the community.

Cast

Alex Keener as Reggie “BuzzSaw” Streeter
D. B. Sweeney as Vince DeAntonio
William Mapother as Bill Burkett
Richard Portnow as John Handon II
Logan Huffman as Bobby Burkett
Maddie Hasson as Renee Donohue
Charlie Carver as John Handon III
Melora Walters as Nancy Smith-Burkett
Jay Thomas as Mike Mayhew
Natalie Imbruglia as Michelle Stratton
Joe Namath as himself

See also
St. Thomas Aquinas High School Knights, the high school football team the film is loosely based on.

References

External links

Official Website (Archived from Original) 

2013 films
2010s English-language films